Nils Isachsen Kulstad (1798 - ??) was a Norwegian politician.

He was elected to the Norwegian Parliament in 1839 and 1842, representing the rural constituency of Nordlands Amt (today named Nordland). He worked as a farmer and fisher.

References

1798 births
Year of death missing
Members of the Storting
Nordland politicians